The Camps quinoline synthesis (also known as the Camps cyclization) is a chemical reaction whereby an o-acylaminoacetophenone is transformed into two different hydroxyquinolines (products A and B) using hydroxide ion.

The relative proportions of the hydroxyquinolines (A and B) produced are dependent upon the 
reaction conditions and structure of the starting material. Although the reaction product is commonly depicted as a quinoline (the enol form), it is believed that the keto form predominates in both the solid state and in solution, making the compound a quinolone. 

An example of the Camps reaction is given below:

The amides of 1,3-enaminoketones react to form pyridinones-2 under similar conditions.

References

See also
Conrad-Limpach synthesis
Doebner reaction

Quinoline forming reactions
Name reactions